The official German hip hop album charts are record charts compiled by GfK Entertainment GmbH on behalf of Bundesverband Musikindustrie (Federal Association of Phonographic Industry). The hip hop charts only include albums and were introduced on 1 April 2015. The chart week runs from Friday to Thursday with the official chart being published on the following Monday. The charts are based on sales of physical albums from retail outlets as well as permanent music downloads and streaming.

Chart history

References

Germany hip hop
Hip hop albums 2016